Krzysztof Szczawiński (born 29 May 1979) is a Polish former professional road cyclist.

Major results

2004
 1st Giro Colline del Chianti
 2nd GP San Giuliano
 6th Tour du Finistère
 6th Tour du Lac Leman
 10th Criterium d'Abruzzo
2005
 3rd Giro del Lazio
 4th Memorial Cimurri
 5th GP Industria & Commercio di Prato
 5th Coppa Sabatini
 6th Giro di Toscana
 7th GP Costa degli Etruschi
 8th Gran Premio Bruno Beghelli
2006
 5th GP Industria & Commercio di Prato
 5th Giro di Toscana
 5th GP Costa degli Etruschi
 6th Coppa Bernocchi
2007
 1st Stage 3b Tour of Bulgaria
 4th Road race, National Road Championships
 7th Giro del Mendrisiotto
 7th GP Costa Degli Etruschi
2008
 10th Gran Premio Bruno Beghelli
 10th GP Kranj
2009
 7th Gran Premio Bruno Beghelli
 10th GP Kranj
 10th GP Costa Degli Etruschi

References

1979 births
Living people
Polish male cyclists
People from Płońsk County